Simon James Brown (born 5 December 1976, in Chelmsford) is an English former footballer who played as a goalkeeper.

Playing career
Brown started his career with Tottenham Hotspur as an apprentice but did not make a first team appearance at White Hart Lane. Instead, he spent several spells on loan at lower league clubs before signing for Colchester United in 1999. After five years and more than 100 starts for the Layer Road club, he moved north to join Hibernian in 2004. Brown struggled to hold down a regular place with Hibernian and was given a free transfer at the end of the 2006–07 season. Upon his exit from Hibs, Brown made a number of public criticisms of manager John Collins, claiming that his training techniques and vanity had alienated the squad during the latter half of his final season at the club.

Brentford manager Terry Butcher signed Brown on 25 June 2007. Brown was transfer listed at the end of his first season with the club. He joined Darlington in a five-month loan deal on 2 August 2008. After his loan spell at Darlington, Brown returned to Brentford after the five months to serve as back up for Ben Hamer who was on loan from Reading. Brown came on as a sub for Hamer on the second last day of the season against Darlington to help Brentford secure promotion to League One. Despite being offered a new deal, Brown left the club when his contract expired on 1 July.

On 11 September 2009, Brown signed with League Two side Northampton Town on a contract until January 2010. After making two appearances for the Cobblers, he signed for Cambridge United on a free transfer on 11 February 2010. On 3 January 2012 he left Cambridge United by mutual consent, joining Welling United. He debuted for the club in their 5–1 Conference South home victory over Truro City on 7 January 2012.

Career statistics

Honours

As a player 

Hibernian
Scottish League Cup: 2006–07

Brentford
Football League Two: 2008–09

As an individual 

 Colchester United Player of the Year: 2002–03

References

External links

1976 births
Living people
Sportspeople from Chelmsford
English footballers
Association football goalkeepers
Tottenham Hotspur F.C. players
Lincoln City F.C. players
Fulham F.C. players
Kingstonian F.C. players
Aylesbury United F.C. players
Colchester United F.C. players
Hibernian F.C. players
Brentford F.C. players
Darlington F.C. players
Northampton Town F.C. players
Cambridge United F.C. players
Welling United F.C. players
English Football League players
Scottish Premier League players
National League (English football) players